Priessnitz is a Czech rock band from Jeseník formed in 1989. The band has released 9 albums, the last one named "Beztíže" (Zero Gravity) was released in October 2016 [1]. In 2016 the Czech Television made a feature of the band, in which the viewer is introduced to the almost 30-year history of Priessnitz. In 2016, the band was nominated for the music prize Apollo for the album Beztíže by the Czech music critics. The Academy of Popular Music in the Czech Republic nominated Priessnitz in the categories of song of the year (Mrzáci) and group of the year as part of the music awards Ceny Anděl 2016.

Discography
 Freiwaldau, Legend/1992, Indies Records/2002
 Nebel, Legend/1992, Indies Records/2003
 Hexe, Bonton, 1994
 Seance, Indies Records, 1996
 Potichu?, Indies Records, 1997
 Zlatý déšť (singl), Indies Records, 1999
 Zero, EMI/Escape, 2001
 Playlist, EMI/Escape, 2004
 Střepy (singl), EMI/Escape, 2006
 Stereo, EMI/Escape, 2006
 Beztíže, Supraphon, 2016

References
 Priessnitz present Swan song album

External links
 Homepage of the band 
 Facebook Profile 
Priessnitz YouTube channel

Czech rock music groups
Musical groups established in 1989
1989 establishments in Czechoslovakia